Grace Valentine (February 14, 1884 – November 12, 1964) was an American stage and film actress.

Early years 
Valentine was born in Springfield, Ohio.

Career
She began her career in the theater in 1905 and toured in stock companies for the next several years. She began her film career in 1915, but never ventured too far away from the legitimate stage.

Valentine's Broadway debut came in The Yellow Jacket (1915). Her final Broadway appearance was in Anna Christie (1952).

In 1929, she appeared in her first talkie and had sporadic parts in films for the next three years whereupon which she returned to the theatre. 

Valentine portrayed Minnie Grady, the title character's landlady, on the radio series Stella Dallas. She also was heard on Lone Journey on radio. In 1949, she made her first television appearance on Chevrolet Tele-Theater. On August 1, 1950, Valentine appeared on television in "The Big Day", an episode of Armstrong Circle Theatre.

Personal life and death
Valentine was married to Wayne Nunn. She died on November 12, 1964, in New York City.

Filmography
The New Adam and Eve (1915) short film
Black Fear (1915)
Man and His Soul (1916)
The Blindness of Love (1916)
The Evil Thereof (1916)
Dorian's Divorce (1916)
The Scarlet Runner (1916)
The Brand of Cowardice (1916)
Babbling Tongues (1917) extant at Library of Congress
The Unchastened Woman (1918) remade in 1925 with Theda Bara
 A Man's Home (1921)
Ain't It the Truth (1929) short film; extant at Library of Congress
The Phantom in the House (1929) extant at Internet Archive
The Silver Lining (1932)
Her Secret (1933)
"The Door", episode of TV series Chevrolet Tele-Theater (1949)
"The Seeker and the Sought", episode of TV series Suspense (1949)
"The Doctor's Wife", episode of TV series Lux Video Theatre (1951)
"The Gomez Case", episode of TV series Janet Dean, Registered Nurse (1954)

References

External links

1884 births
1964 deaths
American silent film actresses
American stage actresses
20th-century American actresses
American television actresses